New Plaza Stadium (Simplified Chinese: 佛山新广场体育场) was a multi-use stadium in Foshan, China.  It was used mostly for football matches and was one of the six stadiums used for the 1991 FIFA Women's World Cup.  The stadium had a capacity of 14,000 people.

References 

Defunct football venues in China
1991 FIFA Women's World Cup stadiums
Buildings and structures in Foshan
Sports venues in Guangdong